Old Golimar Purana Golimar is a neighborhood in the Karachi West district of Karachi, Pakistan. It was previously administered as part of the SITE Town borough, which was disbanded in 2011.

Main areas 
Old Golimar (part of Trans Lyari Karachi's one of the oldest residential areas) is divided into eighteen neighbourhoods as follows:

 Abdullah Village
 Asha Manzil
 Ali Muhammad Village
 Badal Village
 Central Muslimabad Village
 Ghafoor Village
 Ghulam Muhammad Village
 Haji Pariya Village
 Hingoro Village
 Khaskheli Village
 Mistri Khan Village
 Moula Dad Village
 Noor Muhammad Village
 Qadeemi Village
 Rakhsar Line
 Saleh Muhammad Village
 Shah Dost Village
 Naik Muhammad Village
 Rexer

Demographics 
Several ethnic groups inhabit Old Golimar, including  Pathaans, Urdu-speaking Mohajirs, Baloch, Brohi, Sindhis, Punjabis. The oldest inhabitants of Old Golimar are Pathaans called Afridi's from Bara KPK and Baloch from Makran Gwadar, who consist of more than 70% of the total population.

Old Golimar is the centre of Karachi's Afridi & Sheedi community, who are now naturalized as Pathaans of Afghan descent. Sindhi & Baloch of African descent.

Infrastructure 
Old Golimar is one of the oldest parts of Karachi. It has few schools, substandard hospitals, a poor water system, limited infrastructure and broken roads.

Politics 

Old Golimar has always been a stronghold of the ruling Pakistan People's Party(PPP). Now, a divide separates young and old. Imran Khan Pakistan Tehreek-e-Insaf is popular among the young.

Corrupt politics has affected the lives of average residents.

Sports

Football

Old Golimar supports some 15 registered football clubs in Old Golimar, including Wali Afridi, Makran Sports, Parwana Sports, Golimar Azad, Balochistan Raiders and Shabbir Memorial etc.

During Ramadan, a football festival takes place in Old Golimar, A tournament is held in Wali Afridi Ground and Trans Lyari Park (Gutter Baghicha)  etc for over 18 till 14 and under.

Cricket 

Cricket became popular in Old Golimar after the 1996 World Cup, When Pakistan co-hosted the event with India, the cricket team BL-Sports from Noor Mohammad and Saleh Mohammad Village areas became popular.

Most of them amateur players who do not play on senior teams.   

Popular players include Mustafa(murali), Faheem(Sachin), Nasir Ali, Javed Ali, Haroon Shad, Akbar Dad, Mohsin Ali, Adeel Afzal, Akram Sabzal, Asad Abbasi
Ahsan Ali, Akbar JR, Qaiser Abbasi, Kaleemullah Khan Tareen, Abdullah Tareen, Amin Baloch, Younas Baloch, Kamil Baloch, Salman Baloch and Saqib Aashiq Baloch.

Sameer Sports Cricket Club 1996 until 2016.

Asghar Ali Memorial Sports Cricket Club.

B-L-Sports Cricket Club 1996 until 2013.

Bulaidi Sports Cricket Club.

Schools 
Old Golimar has a government school named K.B Conductor Girls School.

White Rose Academy is a private school.

Bright way is a public school.

Rehman Public School is a private school in Old Golimar.

Iqra Public School is also a public school but it is very low in it standards.

Graveyards 
 Muslim Graveyard Mewa Shah Graveyard (Asia's Largest      Graveyard)
 Gujarati community Shamshan Ghaat
 Hindu crematorium

Religious buildings 
 Main Masjid (Mosque) of Old Golimar Rashidun Caliphs

 Noorani Masjid (Mosque)at Noor Mohammad Village.

 Qadeemi Masjid (Mosque) at Qadeemi Muhallah.

 Afghani Masjid (Mosque) at Mistri Khan Village.

 Allah Wali Masjid (Mosque) at Rexerline.

 Usmania Masjid (Mosque) at Abdullah Gorgage Village

 Mustufa Masjid (mosque) at rexer line

See also 
 Lyari Town
 SITE Town

References

External links 
 Karachi Website.
 Local Government Sindh.

Neighbourhoods of Karachi
Lyari Town